Wielowieś may refer to the following places in Poland:
Wielowieś, Krotoszyn County in Greater Poland Voivodeship (west-central Poland)
Wielowieś, Międzychód County in Greater Poland Voivodeship (west-central Poland)
Wielowieś, Ostrów Wielkopolski County in Greater Poland Voivodeship (west-central Poland)
Wielowieś, Gmina Pakość in Kuyavian-Pomeranian Voivodeship (north-central Poland)
Wielowieś, Lubin County in Lower Silesian Voivodeship (south-west Poland)
Wielowieś, Oleśnica County in Lower Silesian Voivodeship (south-west Poland)
Wielowieś, Silesian Voivodeship (south Poland)
Wielowieś, Lubusz Voivodeship (west Poland)
Wielowieś, Warmian-Masurian Voivodeship (north Poland)
Wielowieś, Tarnobrzeg in Podkarpackie Voivodeship (south Poland)